Mir Ahmadi may refer to:
Mir Ahmadi, Kerman
Mir Ahmadi, Razan, Lorestan Province
Mir Ahmadi, Zagheh, Lorestan Province